Ridgeview, West Virginia may refer to:
Ridgeview, Boone County, West Virginia, an unincorporated community in Boone County
Ridgeview, Logan County, West Virginia, an unincorporated community in Logan County